"From Her Lips to God's Ears (The Energizer)" is a song by the Gainesville, Florida-based punk rock band Against Me!, released as the second single from their 2005 album Searching for a Former Clarity. Like the first single "Don't Lose Touch", it was released exclusively on twelve-inch vinyl with a remixed version of the song as the A-side and the album version as the B-side. The A-side version was remixed by Ad-Rock of the Beastie Boys. The single was limited to 3,185 copies. The lyrics of the song address then-United States Secretary of State Condoleezza Rice on the subject of the Iraq War, with lines such as "After all this death and destruction, do you really think your actions advocate freedom?" and "Condoleezza, what are we gonna do now?"

The music video for "From Her Lips to God's Ears (The Energizer)" depicts a fantasy world analogous to that of The Wizard of Oz. A young girl with the head of a rabbit, after watching news footage of Condoleezza Rice defending the United States' police actions in the Iraq War, sets out along a yellow brick road in search of Rice. Along the way she is joined by two men, one with the head of a pig and the other with the head of a chicken, both of whom are also seeking Rice. The trio arrive at a palace in which they find an animatronic puppet with Rice's televised face, to which they pose the question "What are we gonna do now?" The question confounds and overloads the puppet, and the trio escape as it and the building collapse and explode.

Track listing

Personnel

Band
 Laura Jane Grace – guitar, lead vocals
 James Bowman  – guitar, backing vocals
 Andrew Seward – bass guitar, backing vocals
 Warren Oakes – drums

Production
 J. Robbins – producer, engineer, mixing engineer
 Alan Douches – mastering

See also
Against Me! discography

References

External links
 "From Her Lips to God's Ears (The Energizer)" at Against Me!'s official website – includes links to song lyrics
 "From Her Lips to God's Ears (The Energizer)" at Fat Wreck Chords

Songs of the Iraq War
2006 singles
Against Me! songs
Songs written by Laura Jane Grace
2005 songs
Songs written by James Bowman (musician)
Songs written by Warren Oakes
Songs about American politicians
Cultural depictions of American women
Anti-war songs